Derryarkane Stone Circle is an axial stone circle and National Monument located in County Cork, Ireland.

Location

Derryarkane Stone Circle is located 2.4 km (1.5 mi) south of Kealkill.

History

The stone circles were built c. 2500 BC. Five-stone circles like that at Derryarkane are believed to be later in date.

Description
Derryarkane is a stone circle of five stones. The axis of the circle is NE-SW with the axial stone at the southwest.

References

National Monuments in County Cork
Archaeological sites in County Cork